Old Union Methodist Church is a historic Methodist church located  north of Blackbird Crossroads on U.S. 13 in Townsend, New Castle County, Delaware.  It was built in 1847, and is a two-story, brick meeting house measuring 40 feet by 60 feet.  It is surrounded by a cemetery.  

The congregation was organized in 1789.

It was listed on the National Register of Historic Places in 1973.

References

Methodist churches in Delaware
Churches on the National Register of Historic Places in Delaware
Churches completed in 1847
19th-century Methodist church buildings in the United States
Churches in New Castle County, Delaware
1847 establishments in Delaware
National Register of Historic Places in New Castle County, Delaware